Lyon Park may refer to:

Lyon Park, Yerevan, Armenia
Lyon Park (Wisconsin), a public park in Wisconsin Rapids, Wisconsin
Lyon Park Historic District, Arlington, Virginia